Ivan Perišić (born 14 April 1990) is a Montenegrin handball player for Ceglédi KKSE and the Montenegrin national team.

References

1990 births
Living people
Montenegrin male handball players
Sportspeople from Cetinje
Mediterranean Games competitors for Montenegro
Competitors at the 2018 Mediterranean Games